The men's freestyle sprint cross-country skiing competition in the free technique at the 2014 Sochi Olympics took place on 11 February at Laura Biathlon & Ski Complex. Ola Vigen Hattestad won the gold medal.

Qualification

An athlete with a maximum of 100 FIS distance points (the A standard) will be allowed to compete in both or one of the events (sprint/distance). An athlete with a maximum 120 FIS sprint points will be allowed to compete in the sprint event and 10 km for women or 15 km for men provided their distance points do not exceed 300 FIS points. NOC's who do not have any athlete meeting the A standard can enter one competitor of each sex (known as the basic quota) in only 10 km classical event for women or 15 km classical event for men. They must have a maximum of 300 FIS distance points at the end of qualifying on January 20, 2014. The qualification period began in July 2012.

Results
 Q — qualified for next round
 LL — lucky loser
 PF — photo finish

In November 2017, Alexey Petukhov was disqualified from the event.

Qualifying

Quarterfinals
Quarterfinal 1

Quarterfinal 2

Quarterfinal 3

Quarterfinal 4

Quarterfinal 5

Semifinals
Semifinal 1

Semifinal 2

Final
The final was held at 17:40.

References

Men's cross-country skiing at the 2014 Winter Olympics
Men's individual sprint cross-country skiing at the Winter Olympics